DNM may refer to:

Defence Nuclear Material
Det Norske Misjonsforbund, the Mission Covenant Church of Norway
Denham railway station, England 
Darknet market
 United States District Court for the District of New Mexico
 De novo mutation, one of the classification of mutations in biology